, AKA Ken the 390 (Ken za Sankyūmaru), is a Japanese hip hop and R&B singer/rapper and voice actor who is an artist of the Rhythm Zone label owned by the Avex Group.

Life and career
In 1999, Ken the 390 helped in founding the Da.Me.Records label that helped the Japanese hip hop industry to rise.

His debut solo album, Prologue, was released in Japan on March 25, 2006.

The latest album with a title name of Fantastic World was released on October 8, 2008.

Discography

Studio albums
 2006: Prologue (Da.Me.Records, JP)
 Here's Demons [鬼さんこちら]
 3 Oceans [オーシャンズ３]
 LOVE
 Seize the Stars [星をつかめ]
 Time Radio [ラジオの時間]
 Arts & Yabekuri [しゃべくり芸]
 Hajimari Jazz [はじまりのJAZZ]
 Tokyo's Falling Rain [小雨降る東京]
 Walkin'
 Passing Each [すれ違い]
 Whisper of the Heart [耳をすませば ]
 Storage [記憶]
 Back in the Days (part 2)
 Owaranai's Lullaby [終わらないララバイ]
 Prologue [プロローグ]

 2007: My Life (Exit Beats/Pony Canyon, JP)
 Cool Band
 H.I.P. (featuring Mummy-D & Tiara)
 Tonight's the Night
 Super Way to Rap [超・ラップへの道] (featuring Taro Soul & Deji)
 With the Wind... [風を受けて...]
 Summer Madness [サマーマッドネス]
 Alternative [二者択一]
 Big Nature [ビッグネイチャー]
 Tell Me What U Want (featuring ROMANCREW)
 Miss You (featuring Coma-Chi)
 7-Day War [七日間戦争]
 Back in the Days (part 3)
 Touch the Sky
 My Hometown [マイホームタウン]
                                                                      
2007: More Life (Da.Me.Records, JP)
 More Life
 Mid-Summer Dream [真夏の夢]
 Midnight Dating [ミッドナイトデート] (featuring Maya)
 Wrap! ! [ラップ！！] (featuring Cypress Ueno)
 Big Pay Back
 Cross Over (featuring aticus)
 Rainy Sunday [雨の日曜日] (featuring Aya Masaru of ROMANCREW & Maya)
 Free
 Rainbow [虹]
 44
 Good Life

 2008: Fantastic World (Rhythm Zone, JP)
 Fantastic World
 390 Theme [390のテーマ]
 I Gotcha
 Shooting Star [シューティングスター]
 Reach Word [届かないWORD]
 Fresh Snow (Virgin Snow) [新雪(Virgin snow)]
 Flow

 2011: One (Rhythm Zone, JP)
 Intro
 One (featuring Cimba)
 
 I Get So High (featuring Mihiro)
 Music
 
 What's Generation (featuring Rau Def, Shun, Koperu and SKY-HI from AAA)
 
 Heartbeat (Taro Soul and Ken the 390 featuring May J.)
 
 Me...
 
  (bonus)
 Stay (DJ Komori remix) (featuring Shota Shimizu) (bonus)
 The Door (Gunhead remix) (featuring Coma-Chi and Baby M) (bonus)

References

External links
Official site 
Ken the 390 on Rhythm Zone 

Japanese hip hop musicians
Avex Group artists
1981 births
Living people
Recruit (company)